John Forrester (13 July 1887 – 12 February 1946) was a New Zealand cricket umpire. He stood in two Test matches between 1932 and 1933.

See also
 List of Test cricket umpires
 South African cricket team in New Zealand in 1931–32
 English cricket team in New Zealand in 1932–33

References

1887 births
1946 deaths
Place of birth missing
New Zealand Test cricket umpires